The Roman-Secuieni gas field is a natural gas field in Secuieni, Neamț County, Romania lying  of Roman and  from Bacău. It was discovered in 1992 and developed by Romgaz. It began production in September 1995 and produces natural gas and condensates. The total proven reserves of the Roman-Secueni gas field are around 850 billion cubic feet (24 km³), and production is slated to increase from 60 million cubic feet/day (1.68×105m³) in 2007 to 84 million cubic feet/day (2.4×105m³) in 2010.

References

Natural gas fields in Romania